Cần Đước is a township and capital of Cần Đước District, Long An Province, Vietnam.

References

Populated places in Long An province
District capitals in Vietnam
Townships in Vietnam